The 1894 Iowa Hawkeyes football team represented the University of Iowa during the 1894 college football season.  It was the first Hawkeye team to play against in-state rival Iowa State. The Hawkeyes also played future Big Ten rivals Chicago and Wisconsin for the first time. The team's coach was Roger Sherman.

Schedule

References

Iowa
Iowa Hawkeyes football seasons
Iowa Hawkeyes football